Besomebody, Inc. is a Cincinnati-based business innovation firm that provides recruiting, training, job placement and additional services. The company’s Besomebody Paths training program provided selected candidates hands-on skills training resulting in guaranteed jobs with partner employers. Besomebody’s Partner Services division provided partner employers a full suite of services, including business strategy, culture mapping, design, and content and software development. Besomebody was founded by former Procter & Gamble and GoPro employee Kash Shaikh in 2014. The original #besomebody app was launched and scaled globally in 2014 but sold in 2017 after the company's appearance on Shark Tank. Besomebody’s Paths program also began in 2017. Besomebody began as Shaikh’s personal blog in 2011.

Company History 
Besomebody, Inc. was founded in 2014 in Austin, Texas. 

Besomebody originally acted as an intermediary for users to book sessions with what it called 'passionaries': trainers, instructors, or motivational speakers. The company described this as a form of experiential learning.

In 2014, Besomebody raised $1 Million from media company E. W. Scripps Company, and in 2015 it raised an additional $1 million from angel investors. On May 18, 2016, the company announced its relocation to Boston, Massachusetts.  On November 4, 2016, Shaikh pitched Besomebody on Episode 7 of Season 8 of ABC's Shark Tank. He was unsuccessful in securing an investment, as the panelists either felt Besomebody's business model or central premise was flawed, or took issue with Shaikh's pitch. 

Besomebody pivoted its focus and in February 2017 sold its experience marketplace app to Utivity Holdings, Inc., a Denver-based company which offers similar services.

In March 2017 the company relocated to Cincinnati, Ohio and launched its Nutrition Technician Path pilot with Kroger. The company now describes itself as a business innovation firm focused on job placement and employer services.

In November 2018, Besomebody acquired Opening Minds, LLC, a Cincinnati-based multimedia and event firm. The acquisition broadened Besomebody's capabilities in creative, digital and event management services.

In January 2019, Besomebody added artificial intelligence and augmented reality capabilities to its suite of offerings when it acquired Pixelbug Technologies, Inc., a technology firm based in Montreal, Canada.

See also
Uberisation

References 

2014 establishments in the United States
Freelance marketplace websites

Privately held companies of the United States
Companies based in Cincinnati
Online marketplaces of the United States
Employment websites in the United States